Mattia Stefanelli (born 12 March 1993) is a Sammarinese footballer who plays for S.S. Pennarossa and San Marino national team. He scored San Marino's first away goal in the World Cup UEFA qualification competition since 2001.

Biography
Stefanelli is a youth product of Romagna club Cesena. Stefanelli left for Verucchio of Eccellenza Emilia–Romagna in 2010–11 season. He was a player for Cesena reserve in the whole 2011–12 season, despite he missed the rest of season in January 2012. In June 2012 he was signed by Crotone in co-ownership deal for €300,000, despite Cesena would only receive half of the registration rights of Fabrizio Bramati "worth" €300,000. Stefanelli joined the pre-season camp of Romagna club Forlì in July 2012, along with Cesena players Leonardo Arrigoni and Mattia Filippi. However, due to the injury Forlì did not sign Stefanelli, instead signed Daniele Ferri who owned by Cesena and Brescia. Stefanelli was signed by San Marino Calcio on 31 August 2012, a Sammarinese club in Italian football leagues. Stefanelli did not play any game either. On 20 June 2013 the co-ownership of Stefanelli and Bramati were renewed.

In summer 2013 Stefanelli joined Juvenes–Dogana. In June 2014 Cesena gave up the remain 50% registration rights.

On 12 July 2014 he was re-signed by San Marino.

In July 2019, Stefanelli joined S.S. Pennarossa.

International career
For U19, Stefanelli played all 3 games of 2011 UEFA European Under-19 Championship qualification. as well as in 2010 edition.

Stefanelli made his competitive San Marino U21 debut on 3 September 2010, the last match of 2011 UEFA European Under-21 Championship qualification. He also played first 4 games of 2013 UEFA European Under-21 Football Championship qualification Stefanelli did not participated in any matches of 2015 UEFA European Under-21 Football Championship qualification.

Senior team
Stefanelli played 5 times in UEFA Euro 2016 qualifying. On 12 October 2016, Stefanelli scored his first goal for San Marino in the World Cup qualification competition against Norway.

International goals
Scores and results list San Marino's goal tally first.

References

External links
 

Sammarinese footballers
A.C. Cesena players
F.C. Crotone players
A.S.D. Victor San Marino players
S.S. Pennarossa players
Serie C players
Serie D players
Association football forwards
San Marino international footballers
San Marino under-21 international footballers
Campionato Sammarinese di Calcio players
Sammarinese expatriate footballers
Expatriate footballers in Italy
Sammarinese expatriate sportspeople in Italy
1993 births
Living people